Mr. Rooter is a plumbing and drain cleaning franchise with 230  franchises in the United States and 26 franchises in Canada. Mr. Rooter Plumbing franchisees provide plumbing services to residential, commercial and industrial customers. Those plumbing services include: sewer, drain and pipe cleaning services; septic tank pumping; water heater replacement; TV pipe inspection; line and leak detection; excavation, replacement and repair/relining of sewer lines; grease trap pumping; the rental and maintenance of portable toilet facilities; the sale and service of private sewage systems; the sale and service of water-based heating systems; the sale and service of water treatment systems; installation and service of lawn sprinkler systems; and other related services and products pursuant to certain standards and specifications.

History
Mr. Rooter was founded in 1970  and began franchising in 1972. The company is part of the Neighborly family of brands headquartered in Waco, Texas.  Mr. Rooter also franchises in Canada and the United Kingdom (as Drain Doctor).

References

External links
 Mr. Rooter company website

Plumbing
Cleaning companies of the United States